Photodermatology, Photoimmunology and Photomedicine is a peer-reviewed scientific journal published bimonthly by Wiley-Blackwell which focusses, as its title implies, on photodermatology, photoimmunology and photomedicine. Warwick L. Morison is editor-in-chief. It is the official journal of the Photomedicine Society, the British Photodermatology Group, and the European Society for Photodermatology.

History
Photodermatology, Photoimmunology and Photomedicine has been published since 1985. The founding editors were Christer Jansén and Gören Wennersten, other past editors in chief have been Henry Wan-Peng Lim. and Paul R. Bergstresser.

In 2008 the European Society for Photodermatology voted to make Photodermatology, Photoimmunology and Photomedicine its official journal.

Abstracting and indexing
Photodermatology, Photoimmunology and Photomedicine is abstracted and indexed in Academic Search, Biological Abstracts, BIOSIS Previews, Current Contents/Clinical Medicine, CSA Biological Sciences Database, Immunological Abstracts, EMBASE, Journal Citation Reports, MEDLINE/PubMed, Research Alert, and the Science Citation Index. According to the Journal Citation Reports, the journal has a 2014 impact factor of 1.259, ranking it 40th out of 63 journals in the category "Dermatology".

See also
 Journal of Photochemistry and Photobiology
 Photochemical and Photobiological Sciences
 Photochemistry and Photobiology

References

External links
 

Publications established in 1984
Wiley-Blackwell academic journals
English-language journals
Quarterly journals
Dermatology journals
Immunology journals